Tussahaw Creek is a stream in the U.S. state of Georgia. It empties into Lake Jackson.

Tussahaw is a name derived from the Muskogean language. Variant names are "Thesahaw Creek", "Tusahaw Creek", "Tusseehaw Creek", "Tussy Haw Creek".

References

Rivers of Georgia (U.S. state)
Rivers of Butts County, Georgia
Rivers of Henry County, Georgia